Mark Alexander Ballas Jr. (born May 24, 1986) is an American dancer, choreographer, singer-songwriter, musician, and actor.

Ballas is a professional ballroom dancer on the ABC program Dancing with the Stars. He began competing on the show in season five during the fall of 2007 and was nominated for an Emmy for Outstanding Choreography in 2011. Ballas released his first solo CD HurtLoveBox in March 2011.

Personal life
Ballas was born in Houston, Texas, the son of dancers Corky Ballas and Shirley Ballas (née Rich). His paternal grandparents were of Mexican and Greek background, and his mother is originally from the United Kingdom and is of predominantly English heritage. His mother also has distant Malagasy ancestry from Madagascar. His paternal grandfather, George Ballas, was the inventor of the Weed Eater lawn-trimming device. His paternal great-grandparents, Karolos ("Charles") Ballas and Maria Lymnaos were immigrants to the United States from Greece.

Ballas is a member of singer-songwriter duo Alexander Jean along with his wife, BC Jean. The two became engaged in November 2015 after three years of dating, and were married on 25 November 2016, in Malibu, California.

Career

Early life
Ballas attended Rosemead Preparatory School in South London. At the age of 11, he earned a full-time slot at the Italia Conti Academy of Theatre Arts in London, as well as earning a full scholarship. In 2005, he was awarded "Performer of the Year". He then moved on to win championships at The British Open to the World, The US Open to the World, and The International Open to the World. With his former partner Julianne Hough, he won the Junior Latin American Dance Championship and the gold medal at the Junior Olympics.

Acting

As an actor, Ballas played the lead role of Tony in the musical Copacabana and was the lead dancer in the UK national tour of the Spanish musical Maria de Buenos Aires. He was also the understudy for the role of Ritchie Valens in the UK national tour of Buddy, The Buddy Holly Story. Ballas played an extra in Harry Potter and the Sorcerer's Stone as part of the Hufflepuff House. In October 2008, Ballas made a guest appearance on the season premiere of Samantha Who.

On 6 September 2016, it was announced that Ballas would be the final actor to portray the role of Frankie Valli in the Broadway cast of Jersey Boys before it closes in 2017. On 26 May 2018, it was announced that he would play the role of the Teen Angel in the 2018 Toronto revival of Grease in a limited engagement from 7–10 June. From 11 September 2018 to 18 November 2018, Ballas portrayed Charlie Price in the musical Kinky Boots on Broadway.

Dancing with the Stars
On the fifth season of Dancing with the Stars, Ballas was partnered with Cheetah Girls star Sabrina Bryan. On 30 October 2007, the pair was voted off the show. They have been the only couple invited back for an exhibition dance.

Ballas's partner for season 6 of Dancing with the Stars was Olympic Gold Medal-winning figure skater Kristi Yamaguchi. They won the season.

On 25 August 2008, ABC announced the cast of the seventh season of Dancing with the Stars, with Ballas paired with reality television star Kim Kardashian. They were the third couple eliminated, finishing in eleventh place, on 30 September 2008.

For the eighth season of Dancing with the Stars, Ballas was paired with Olympic gold-medal winning gymnast Shawn Johnson, winning that season's competition on 19 May 2009.

He was partnered with actress Melissa Joan Hart for the show's ninth season. They were voted off in week six and came in 9th place.

For season 10, Ballas was partnered with actress Shannen Doherty. They were the first couple eliminated, on 30 March 2010. Despite that, Shannen & Mark hold a higher average than a few celebrities who lasted longer than they did.

For season 11, Ballas was partnered with Bristol Palin, daughter of former Alaska governor and U.S. Vice-Presidential candidate Sarah Palin. They made it to the finale and finished in third place.

For season 12, Ballas was partnered with Disney Channel star Chelsea Kane. They made it to the finals where they finished in third place. For his choreography with Kane, specifically the Jive ("I Write Sins Not Tragedies"), Viennese Waltz ("Hedwig's Theme") and Waltz ("My Love") dances, Ballas was nominated for that year's Primetime Emmy Award for Outstanding Choreography.

For season 13, Ballas was partnered with reality star Kristin Cavallari where they were the 3rd couple eliminated finishing in 10th place. In spite of this, they retained a higher average than a few couples that easily outlasted them, including Nancy Grace & Tristan MacManus, the quarter-finalists of the season.

For season 14, he was partnered with Classical Singer Katherine Jenkins. They made it to the finale where they finished as the runners-up, losing to Donald Driver & Peta Murgatroyd.

For season 15, he returned with season 11 partner, Bristol Palin before being eliminated in week 4. In week 7, he danced with his former partner Shawn Johnson because her partner, Derek Hough suffered a neck injury.

He was paired with two-time Olympic champion Aly Raisman for season 16. Since season 16 had four couples reach the finals for the first time, Aly and Mark were able to become finalists. On 21 May, however, they were eliminated at the beginning of the show landing them in fourth place.

For season 17, he was paired with singer Christina Milian. They were the 4th couple eliminated despite receiving high scores and good comments from the judges.

For season 18, he partnered with Full House actress Candace Cameron Bure. The couple made it to the finals and ended in third place.

For season 19, he partnered with Duck Dynasty star Sadie Robertson and finished in 2nd place behind Alfonso Ribeiro.

For season 20, he was paired with star of The Hunger Games film series Willow Shields. The couple was shockingly eliminated in week 7, finishing in seventh place despite receiving high scores throughout the season.

For season 21, he was partnered with actress Alexa PenaVega. They were eliminated in week 9 (despite being at the top of the leaderboard that week) and finished the competition in 6th place.

For season 22, he was paired with UFC mixed martial artist Paige VanZant. Ballas and VanZant made it to the finals of the show and finished in second place. Ballas was not part of the season 23 & 24 cast.

Ballas returned as a professional dancer for season 25, and was paired with violinist Lindsey Stirling. Ballas and Stirling made it to the finals and finished in second place.

Ballas returned to the show for season 31. He was partnered with social media personality and dancer Charli D'Amelio. They won the competition, making this Ballas' third win on the show and his first win since Season 8.

Records
In his time on Dancing With the Stars, Ballas has set, and broken, numerous records in the course of his (so far) 18 seasons. Some of these records include, but are not limited to:
 Highest premiere score of 27 with Kristi Yamaguchi in Season 6.
 This record was later matched by Amber Riley & Derek Hough in Season 17, Charlie White & Sharna Burgess in Season 18, and Alfonso Ribeiro & Witney Carson in Season 19.
Pro with the most partners who received at least one score of '9' on premiere night: 5, including Sabrina Bryan (Season 5), Kristi Yamaguchi (Season 6), Katherine Jenkins (Season 14), Candace Cameron Bure (Season 18), and Sadie Robertson (Season 19).
 Only male professional to place the same in finals (Seasons 11 & 12) twice in a row without winning.
 Ballas achieved this feat again in Seasons 22 and 25, as he was not competing in Seasons 23 and 24. In both instances, he had different placements.
 Partner of the youngest celebrity contestant, Willow Shields (Season 20).
 Pro to finish in second place the most times with Katherine Jenkins (Season 14), Sadie Robertson (Season 19), Paige VanZant (Season 22), and Lindsey Stirling (Season 25).
 Pro to make the finals the most times, he appeared in the finals 11 times.

Alexander Jean 

Alexander Jean is a duo formation made up of Mark Ballas and his wife BC Jean. They worked as a husband-wife American pop rock duo starting 2015. Their debut single was "Roses and Violets". The single reach the Top 20 on Billboard's Hot 100 "Bubbling Under" chart. They had success with "Waiting for You" and were nominated Elvis Duran's Artist of the Month in November 2018.

Dancing with the Stars performances
 Season 5 with celebrity partner Sabrina Bryan (average: 27.0); placed 7th

 Season 6 with celebrity partner Kristi Yamaguchi (average: 28.3); placed 1st

 Season 7 with celebrity partner Kim Kardashian (average: 18.0); placed 11th

 Season 8 with celebrity partner Shawn Johnson (average: 26.94); placed 1st

 Season 9 with celebrity partner Melissa Joan Hart (average: 21.2); placed 9th

 Season 10 with celebrity partner Shannen Doherty (average: 19.0); placed 11th

 Season 11 with celebrity partner Bristol Palin (average: 22.6); placed 3rd

 Season 12 with celebrity partner: Chelsea Kane (average: 26.13); placed 3rd

 Season 13 with celebrity partner: Kristin Cavallari (average: 21.6); placed 10th

 Season 14 with celebrity partner: Katherine Jenkins (average: 27.9); placed 2nd

 Season 15 (All-Stars) with celebrity partner: Bristol Palin (average: 21.0); placed 9th

 Season 16 with celebrity partner: Aly Raisman (average: 26.7); placed 4th

 Season 17 with celebrity partner: Christina Milian (average: 25.0); placed 9th

 Season 18 with celebrity partner: Candace Cameron Bure (average: 25.5); placed 3rd

 Season 19 with celebrity partner: Sadie Robertson (average: 35.6); placed 2nd

Season 20 with celebrity partner Willow Shields (average: 34.0); placed 7th

Season 21 with celebrity partner Alexa PenaVega (average: 25.8); placed 6th

Season 22 with celebrity partner Paige VanZant (average: 27.1); placed 2nd

 Season 25 with celebrity partner Lindsey Stirling (average: 27.1); placed 2nd

Season 31 with celebrity partner Charli D'Amelio (average: 37.7); placed 1st

Discography
*(For discography as part of band with Derek Hough, see Ballas Hough Band)
*(For discography as part of duo with BC Jean, see Alexander Jean)

References

External links

1986 births
Living people
21st-century American male actors
21st-century American singers
Alumni of the Italia Conti Academy of Theatre Arts
American ballroom dancers
American male actors of Mexican descent
American male dancers
American male guitarists
American male musical theatre actors
American male stage actors
American musicians of Mexican descent
American people of English descent
American people of Greek descent
Ballas family
Dancing with the Stars (American TV series) winners
Entertainers from London
Guitarists from Texas
Hispanic and Latino American male actors
Hispanic and Latino American musicians
Male actors from Houston
Male actors from London
Musicians from Houston
Musicians from London
Singers from London
Singers from Texas